Samura is both a surname and a given name. Notable people with the name include:

 , Japanese manga artist
 Kabba Samura (born 1981), Sierra Leonean footballer
 , Japanese judoka
 Samura Kamara (born 1951), Sierra Leonean politician and economist
 Samura ibn Jundab (died 670s), companion of Muhammad
 Sorious Samura (born 1963), Sierra Leonean journalist
 Suleiman Samura (born 1997), Sierra Leonean footballer

Japanese-language surnames